This is a list of chocolate-covered foods. Chocolate is a typically sweet, usually brown, food preparation of Theobroma cacao seeds, roasted and ground, often flavored, as with vanilla. It is made in the form of a liquid, paste or in a block or used as a flavoring ingredient in other sweet foods.

Chocolate-covered foods

 Chocolate biscuit – many types of biscuits (notably cookies, shortbreads, digestive biscuits, wafers) are often covered in chocolate
 Chocolate bar – many varieties have a chocolate coating
Caramel apple – although traditionally covered in just caramel or caramel and nuts, chocolate is often added, sometimes in decorative patterns.
 Chocolate-coated marshmallow treats (including Peeps) – produced in different variations around the world, with several countries claiming to have invented it or hailing it as their "national confection". The first chocolate-coated marshmallow treat was created in the early 1800s in Denmark.
 Chocolate-coated peanut – peanuts coated in a shell of milk chocolate. They have a reputation in many countries of being food eaten in movie theaters. In some countries, they are also known as Goobers, which is the earliest and one of the most popular brands of the product, made by Nestlé. Goobers were introduced in the United States in 1925 by the Blumenthal Chocolate Company. Nestlé acquired the brand in 1984. A large number of other brands also exist.
 Chocolate-covered almonds – many places on the Internet claim that July 8 is (American) National Milk Chocolate with Almonds Day, while November 2 is National Bitter Chocolate with Almonds Day.
 Chocolate-covered fruit – such as strawberries, cherries and bananas
 Chocolate-covered cherry – variations include cherry cordial (candy) with liquid fillings often including cherry liqueur, as well as chocolate covered candied cherries and chocolate covered dried cherries.
 Chocolate-covered prune – chocolate-covered prunes or plums are a typical Polish delicacy.
 Chocolate-covered bacon – a North American novelty that consists of cooked bacon with a coating of either milk chocolate or dark chocolate. It can be topped with sea salt, crumbled pistachio, or almond bits.
 Chocolate-covered coffee bean – confections made by coating roasted coffee beans in some kind of chocolate: dark chocolate, milk chocolate, or white chocolate. They are usually only slightly sweet, especially the dark chocolate kind, and the intense, bitter flavor of the coffee beans can be overwhelming for non-coffee-drinkers.
 Chocolate-covered potato chips – an American snack food or confectionery, consisting of potato chips that have been dipped into melted chocolate or cocoa, and coated with the chocolate. They were introduced into the market in Chicago in 1985 by a company called Executive Sweets.
 Chocolate-covered raisin – raisins coated in a shell of milk, dark or white chocolate. Commonly available in movie theaters in many countries, they were traditionally sold by weight from jars in candy stores.
 Club – a range of chocolate covered biscuits sold in Ireland under the Jacob's brand name and in the United Kingdom under McVitie's
 Cordials – confection in which a fruit filling is placed within a chocolate shell. A well known confectionery of this type is the cherry cordial.
 Doughnut – several varieties are covered in chocolate
 Insects – such as ants, grasshoppers and crickets
 Lebkuchen – a traditional German baked Christmas treat, somewhat resembling gingerbread. Some varieties are chocolate-covered.
 Liqueur chocolate - chocolate filled with alcoholic liquids
 Chocolate covered Nuts, including Macadamia nuts – the nuts can be covered individually or in clumps or bars
 Milk Duds – a caramel candy, historically enrobed with milk chocolate, and presently enrobed with a confectionery coating made from cocoa and vegetable oil
 Pretzel – some varieties are produced with a chocolate coating
 Ptasie mleczko  – (Polish) a soft chocolate-covered candy filled with soft meringue (or milk soufflé)
 Túró Rudi – chocolate-coated curd bars
 Tunnock's teacake – manufactured by Thomas Tunnock, they consist of a small round shortbread biscuit covered with Italian meringue, and then encased in a thin layer of milk or dark chocolate and wrapped.
 Wafer – some varieties are covered or coated with chocolate
 Winter ice cream – wafer cones filled with flavored cream and coated with chocolate
 Zefir – a type of soft confectionery made by whipping fruit and berry purée (mostly apple puree) with sugar and egg whites with subsequent addition of a gelling agent like pectin, agar, or gelatine. Chocolate-coated versions are common.

Similar dishes
 Chocolate fountain – a device for serving chocolate fondue. Typical examples resemble a stepped cone, standing 2–4 feet tall with a crown at the top and stacked tiers over a basin at the bottom. The basin is heated to keep the chocolate in a liquid state so it can be pulled into a center cylinder then vertically transported to the top of the fountain by a corkscrew auger. From there it flows over the tiers creating a chocolate "waterfall" in which foods such as strawberries or marshmallows can be dipped.

See also

 List of chocolate bar brands
 List of chocolate beverages
 Outline of chocolate
 Types of chocolate

References

 
Chocolate
Chocolatey I was